The 2014 FIBA U20 European Championship Division B was the 10th edition of the Division B of the European basketball championship for men's national under-20 teams. It was played from 10 to 20 July 2014 in Sarajevo, Bosnia and Herzegovina.

Participating teams

  (19th place, 2013 FIBA Europe Under-20 Championship Division A)

  (20th place, 2013 FIBA Europe Under-20 Championship Division A)

  (18th place, 2013 FIBA Europe Under-20 Championship Division A)

First round
In the first round, the teams were drawn into two groups of seven. The first two teams from each group advance to the semifinals; the third and fourth teams advance to the 5th–8th place playoffs; the fifth and sixth teams advance to the 9th–12th place playoffs; the last teams will play the 13th place match.

Group A

Group B

13th place match

9th−12th place playoffs

9th–12th place semifinals

11th place match

9th place match

5th−8th place playoffs

5th–8th place semifinals

7th place match

5th place match

Championship playoffs

Semifinals

3rd place match

Final

Final standings

See also
2014 FIBA Europe Under-20 Championship (Division A)

References

FIBA U20 European Championship Division B
FIBA Europe Under-20 Championship Division B
2014–15 in Bosnia and Herzegovina basketball
International youth basketball competitions hosted by Bosnia and Herzegovina
Sports competitions in Sarajevo
July 2014 sports events in Europe
FIBA Europe U-20 Championship Division B
FIBA U20